Okara Cantonment railway station (Urdu and ) is located in Okara cantonment, 10 km away from Okara city, Okara district of Punjab province, Pakistan.

Train Crash

On September 29, 1957, a Karachi-bound express passenger train collided at full speed with a stationary oil-tanker train before midnight, on Gambar Railway Station. 300 people were killed and 150 wounded by the accident.

See also
 List of railway stations in Pakistan
 Pakistan Railways

References

External links

Railway stations in Okara District
Railway stations on Karachi–Peshawar Line (ML 1)